Dave Radlauer is the radio host of radio show Jazz Rhythm.

Radlauer explores the works of well-known and obscure musicians on his radio show Jazz Rhythm. In 2009 his show received a Gabriel Award. His Jazz Rhythm website is a compendium of early jazz history, rare photos and some 500 hours of exclusive audio rarities, interviews and programs on 120 early jazz topics.

Radlauer plays traditional jazz music and interviews jazz musicians.

References

External links
 Jazz Rhythm

American radio journalists
Living people
Year of birth missing (living people)
Place of birth missing (living people)